Mixed 10 m platform synchro event at the 2019 European Diving Championships was contested on 9 August.

Results
Five pairs of athletes participated at the single-round event.

References

M